The 2021 USC Trojans football team represents the University of Southern California in the 2021 NCAA Division I FBS football season. They play their home games at the Los Angeles Memorial Coliseum and compete as members of the South Division of the Pac-12 Conference. They were led by sixth-year head coach Clay Helton in the first two games; Helton was fired on September 13 following the team's 28–42 loss to Stanford. Associate head coach Donte Williams took over as the team's interim head coach.

The Trojans finished the 2021 season at 4–8. It was their worst record since 1991, when they went 3–8.

Previous season

The Trojans finished 5–1 in 2020 season. They represented the South Division in the Pac-12 Championship Game where Oregon become Pac-12 Champions (24–31).

Offseason

Transfers

The Trojans lost nine players via transfer.

The Trojans add nine players and one walk-on player via transfer.

Returning Starters

USC returns 26 starters in 2021 including 11 on offense, 12 on defense, and 3 on special teams.

Key departures include Amon-Ra St. Brown (WR – 6 games), Tyler Vaughns (WR – 5 games), Alijah Vera-Tucker (OL – 6 games), Marlon Tuipulotu (DT – 6 games), Olaijah Griffin (CB – 5 games), and Talanoa Hufanga (S – 6 games).

Offense (11)

Defense (12)

Special teams (3)

2021 NFL draft

The official list of participants for the 2021 Senior Bowl included USC football player Marlon Tuipulotu (DT).

The official list of participants for the 2021 NFL Combine included USC football players to be announced soon.

Team players drafted into the NFL

Recruiting class

Personnel

Coaching staff

Roster

Depth Chart

 Depth Chart after Week 9 vs. Arizona Wildcats

True Freshman

Injury report

Scholarship distribution chart

 /  / * Former Walk-on

– 85 scholarships permitted, 95 currently allotted to players via extra Seniors.

– 95 recruited players on scholarship

Scholarship Distribution 2021

Schedule

Spring Game

2021 Cardinal vs Gold Spring Game

Regular season

Game summaries

San José State

Stanford

at Washington State

Oregon State

at Colorado

Utah

at No. 13 Notre Dame

Arizona

at Arizona State

UCLA

No. 13 BYU

at California

Rankings

Statistics

USC vs Opponents

USC vs Pac-12 opponents

Offense

Defense

Key: POS: Position, SOLO: Solo Tackles, AST: Assisted Tackles, TOT: Total Tackles, TFL: Tackles-for-loss, SACK: Quarterback Sacks, INT: Interceptions, BU: Passes Broken Up, PD: Passes Defended, QBH: Quarterback Hits, FR: Fumbles Recovered, FF: Forced Fumbles, BLK: Kicks or Punts Blocked, SAF: Safeties, TD : Touchdown

Special teams

After the Season

Final statistics

Awards and honors

Conference

National

All-Americans

Bowl games

All Star games

NFL draft

The NFL Draft will be held at Allegiant Stadium in Paradise, Nevada on April 28–30, 2022.
 
Trojans who attended the 2022 NFL Draft:

CFL Global Draft

The 2022 CFL Global Draft will be held in Toronto on May 3, 2022.
 
Trojans who attended the 2022 CFL Global Draft:

NFL Draft combine
Five members of the 2021 team were invited to participate in drills at the 2022 NFL Scouting Combine.
 

† Top performer
 
DNP = Did not participate

NFL Pro Day
Sixteen members of the 2021 team were invited to participate in drills at the NFL Pro Day 2022.
 

† Top performer
 
DNP = Did not participate

Notes
 August 19, 2020 – USC DT Jay Tufele declares for 2021 NFL Draft.
 November 30, 2020 – Kyron Ware-Hudson flips from Oregon to USC football recruiting class for 2021.
 December 1, 2020 – USC football kicker Chase McGrath enters transfer portal.
 December 3, 2020 – Top USC football commit Jake Garcia decommits from the Trojans.
 December 7, 2020 – USC football loses linebacker Palaie Gaoteote to transfer portal.
 December 11, 2020 – USC football adds Alabama DT Ishmael Sopsher via transfer.
 December 16, 2020 – USC Football Announces Early Signing Period 2021 Class.
 December 19, 2020 – USC Football Opts Out Of Playing In A Bowl.
 December 25, 2020 – USC football adds Xavion Alford as transfer from Texas.
 December 28, 2020 – USC football's Alijah Vera-Tucker declares for NFL Draft.
 December 28, 2020 – Markese Stepp enters transfer portal intending to leave USC football.
 December 30, 2020 – Talanoa Hufanga declares for NFL Draft after All-American season for USC football.
 December 31, 2020 – USC Cornerbacks Coach Donte Williams Adds Associate Head Coach Title.
 January 1, 2021 – USC defensive lineman Marlon Tuipulotu declares for NFL Draft.
 January 2, 2021 – USC receiver Amon-Ra St. Brown enters the 2021 NFL Draft.
 January 2, 2021 – Ceyair Wright commits to USC football recruiting class for 2021.
 January 2, 2021 – Korey Foreman, Nation's No. 1 Overall Recruit, Signs With USC Football.
 January 3, 2021 – Tim Drevno, Aaron Ausmus Will Not Return To USC Football Coaching Staff.
 January 4, 2021 – USC football recruiting rolls into 2022 with Fabian Ross commitment.
 January 4, 2021 – USC wide receiver Tyler Vaughns declares for NFL Draft.
 January 16, 2021 – Robert Stiner Named Director of Football Sports Performance At USC.

Notes

References

USC
USC Trojans football seasons
USC Trojans football
USC Trojans football